Cristian Lucian Munteanu (born 17 October 1980) is a Romanian footballer who plays as a central defender for Viitorul Dăești.

Club career

Early career
Munteanu started his professional career at the age of twenty with the local club West Petrom Arad, in the Romanian Liga III. He spent a year playing for his home side.

FC Bihor
He was soon noticed by Liga II club FC Bihor Oradea, who bought him from Petrom Arad. There, Munteanu quickly established himself in the starting eleven and he spent four and a half years with the team, also playing in the 2003–04 Liga I.

MFC Sopron
In the summer of 2005 Munteanu moved to MFC Sopron in the first division of Hungary. Due to financial problems, he left after two season and 35 matches.

Politehnica Iaşi
On 1 July 2007, he was bought by Politehnica Iaşi for a fee of €50,000. Here he rejoined his former coach at FC Bihor, Ionuţ Popa. Munteanu immediately imposed himself in the starting lineup, and he stayed there until the end of the 2009–10 Liga I season when Poli were relegated to the Liga II.

CSMS Iași
In the summer of 2014, he returned to Iași, signing a contract with CSMS.

References

External links
 
 
 
 

1980 births
Living people
Sportspeople from Arad, Romania
Romanian footballers
Association football defenders
Liga I players
Liga II players
Liga III players
Nemzeti Bajnokság I players
FC Bihor Oradea players
FC Politehnica Iași (1945) players
ASA 2013 Târgu Mureș players
FC Brașov (1936) players
AFC Săgeata Năvodari players
FC Sopron players
FC Politehnica Iași (2010) players
FC Universitatea Cluj players
FC Viitorul Constanța players
SCM Râmnicu Vâlcea players
CS Sportul Snagov players
FC Olimpia Satu Mare players
CS Pandurii Târgu Jiu players
Romanian expatriate footballers
Expatriate footballers in Hungary
Romanian expatriate sportspeople in Hungary